Action of the Tiger is a 1957 British CinemaScope action film directed by Terence Young and starring Van Johnson and Martine Carol. It was distributed by MGM.

The plot is about the rescue of a political prisoner held in Albania. Carson, played by Van Johnson, is an American contraband runner approached by Tracy, a French woman who wants him to help rescue her brother. Supporting actor Sean Connery would reunite with director Terence Young for the first film in the James Bond series, Dr. No (1962).

The title comes from William Shakespeare's play Henry V.

Plot
French heiress Tracy Mallambert, in search for her brother Henri after rumors that he defected during a diplomatic post, tries to bribe the ship captain Carson in Athens, Greece, to smuggle her into the People's Socialist Republic of Albania. Although he refuses, she sneaks onto his ship anyways and he reluctantly agrees to transport her. She learns that he is smuggling out Greek refugee children from Northern Epirus. Carson's contact Kol Stendho abandons them in the village of Vojsev after shooting an Albanian People's Army sentry, where they find Henri in a cathedral. Carson agrees to break Henri, who was arrested and blinded by Communist authorities, and his lover Mara out of the country. Tracy and Carson take Henri, Mara, and a group of children out of the country as they begin to fall in love. The group is ambushed by bandits led by Trifon who agree to escort the rest of the group into Greece in exchange for allowing Tracy to remain with them. However, the bandits are killed attacking a fake border checkpoint and the rest are captured. Kol returns in disguise as an Albanian officer and rescues them. They finally escape a battalion of Albanian soldiers aboard Carson's yacht.

Cast
Van Johnson as Carson
Martine Carol as Tracy
Herbert Lom as Trifon
Gustavo Rojo as Henri
José Nieto as Kol Stenho
Helen Haye as The Countess
Anna Gerber as Mara 
Anthony Dawson as Security Officer
Sean Connery as Mike 
Yvonne Romain as Katina 
Norman MacOwan as Trifon's father
Helen Goss  as Farmer's Wife
Richard Williams as Abdyll

Production 
The film was shot primarily in Spain, with Almuñécar serving as headquarters. Other scenes were shot in Athens and MGM-British Studios, Elstree.

Reception
According to MGM records, the film earned $465,000 in the United States and Canada and $1,175,000 elsewhere, resulting in a net profit of $25,000.

See also
 List of American films of 1957

References

External links

1957 films
British action thriller films
CinemaScope films
Cold War films
Films directed by Terence Young
Films scored by Humphrey Searle
Films set in Albania
Metro-Goldwyn-Mayer films
Political thriller films
Seafaring films
Films set in the Mediterranean Sea
1950s action films
1950s English-language films
Films set in Athens
Films shot at MGM-British Studios
1950s British films